The 1998 IGA Tennis Classic was a women's tennis tournament played on indoor hard courts at The Greens Country Club in Oklahoma City, Oklahoma in the United States that was part of Tier III of the 1998 WTA Tour. It was the 13th edition of the tournament and was held from February 23 through March 1, 1998.

Finals

Singles

 Venus Williams defeated  Joannette Kruger 6–3, 6–2
 It was Williams' first singles title of her career.

Doubles

 Serena Williams /  Venus Williams defeated  Cătălina Cristea /  Kristine Kunce 7–5, 6–2
 It was Serena Williams' 1st title of the year and the 1st of her career. It was Venus Williams' 2nd title of the year and the 2nd of her career.

References

External links
 ITF tournament edition details
 Tournament draws

IGA Classic
U.S. National Indoor Championships
IGA Tennis Classic
IGA Tennis Classic
IGA Tennis Classic